Agony of Christ is a 2009 Ghanaian film directed by Frank Rajah Arase.

Plot 
A young man ran away from his village because the traditional priestess wanted him killed.  He was saved by Christians who trained him in the knowledge of Christianity and he became born again. He returned to his village where they were worshippers of lesser gods. His task of converting everyone in the village into a Christian was thwarted by the priestess of the land, who did not allow that to happen thereby engaging him in spiritual battle.

Cast 
 Majid Michel
 Nadia Buari
 Kofi Adjorlolo
 Eddie Nartey
 Naana Hayford
Solomon Sampah
Yvonne Okoro
Kofi Adjorlolo
Samuel Nii Odoi Mensah
Prince David Osei

References

Ghanaian drama films
2009 films
2000s English-language films
English-language Ghanaian films